Microtropis borneensis is a species of plant in the family Celastraceae. It is endemic to Borneo.

References

borneensis
Endemic flora of Borneo
Vulnerable plants
Taxonomy articles created by Polbot